Thongwa Township is a township of Yangon Region, Myanmar, located in the southeastern section of the region by the Gulf of Martaban.

References

Townships of Yangon Region